Philippe Richard (24 June 1891 – 24 December 1973) was a French film and theater actor.

Richard was born in Saint-Étienne and began his film career in the early 1920s in silent film. In 1948 he starred in the film The Lame Devil under Sacha Guitry. He died in Paris in 1973.

Selected filmography
 The Clairvoyant (1924)
 Fantômas (1932)
 The Accomplice (1932)
 The Agony of the Eagles (1933)
 The Tunnel (1933)
 Night in May (1934)
 The Devil in the Bottle (1935)
 Compliments of Mister Flow (1936)
 Nitchevo (1936)
 27 Rue de la Paix (1936)
 Pépé le Moko (1937)
 The Alibi (1937)
 The Club of Aristocrats (1937)
 The Citadel of Silence (1937)
 Yoshiwara (1937)
 The Novel of Werther (1938)
 The West (1938)
 Adrienne Lecouvreur (1938)
 The Phantom Carriage (1939)
 Serenade (1940)
 Monsieur Hector (1940)
 Paris-New York (1940)
 The Emigrant (1940)
 Mandrin (1947)
 The Woman I Murdered (1948)
 The Night Is My Kingdom (1951)
 Heart of the Casbah (1952)
 Koenigsmark (1953)
 When You Read This Letter (1953)
 The Call of Destiny (1953)

External links

1891 births
1973 deaths
French male stage actors
French male film actors
French male silent film actors
Actors from Saint-Étienne
20th-century French male actors